Endoxyla cinereus, the giant wood moth, is a moth in the family Cossidae. It is found in Australia (Queensland, New South Wales) and New Zealand. The species was first described in 1890. A rare contemporary sighting of the moth at a school in Australia garnered notice as an editor's pick among the daily headlines of the New York Times on May 8, 2021. 

It is the heaviest moth in the world; weighing up to 30 g. Its wingspan is approximately 23 cm, or just over nine inches.

The larvae bore into the trunks of trees of the Eucalyptus species. Pupation takes place in the larval tunnel.

References

Further reading

External links
 

Endoxyla (moth)
Moths described in 1890
Moths of Australia
Moths of New Zealand